Homidia sauteri is a species of slender springtail in the family Entomobryidae.

Subspecies
These two subspecies belong to the species Homidia sauteri:
 Homidia sauteri formosana Uchida, 1943
 Homidia sauteri sauteri

References

Entomobryomorpha
Articles created by Qbugbot
Animals described in 1929